is a Japanese anime television series based on the Virtua Fighter series of video games made by Sega-AM2. Produced by TV Tokyo, Yomiko Advertising and TMS Entertainment, it was directed by Hideki Tonokatsu, with Tsutomu Kamishiro handling series scripts, Ryō Tanaka designing the characters, Satoshi Katō serving as sound director and Kaoru Ōhori composing the music. Targeted towards children aged 6 to 15 years old, the series originally aired on TV Tokyo from October 2, 1995 to June 27, 1996. The episodes take place before the first game in the series, and accordingly portray the characters as slightly younger than they are in the games. 

A video game based on the series, Virtua Fighter Animation, was released in 1996.

Plot
The series follows Akira Yuki and his quest to see the eight stars of heaven after he had gotten overconfident in his Bajiquan skills from his days training with his grandfather. Initially traveling to figure out how to see those stars again, he learns that Sarah Bryant was kidnapped by robotics scientist Eva Durix as part of Eva's quest to create the "Perfect Soldier." 

Akira joins up with other characters in his journey such as Pai Chan, Jacky Bryant, Lion Rafale, Kage-Maru and Shun Di to save Sarah.

Characters

Some of the following characters who appear in the show are based on those in Virtua Fighter and Virtua Fighter 2, while some were created solely for the show.

 
Unlike his video game counterpart, Akira enjoys overeating and slacking off. Akira fights only when he sees people getting into trouble, but often gets into minor problems, such as when he accidentally touches Sarah Bryant's breast or when he gives Pai Chan a kiss (which results in a beating).

 
Initially meeting with Akira after an encounter in the Los Angeles Chinatown district, she joins up with him so as to avoid being hunted down by renegade Koenkan fighters, her estranged father, Lau Chan and her supposed fiancée, Liu Kowloon. In the series, Pai gets along with Akira despite his everlasting appetite, then eventually develop feelings for him. According to her (unlike her video game counterpart), she learned Ensei-ken forcibly by her father when she was a little girl, rather than by his kind persuasion. Her mother, never shown in the games themselves, was instead shown in the anime, having died of an illness when she was little as opposed to Pai's mother dying when she was 16.

 
Pai's estranged father, Lau wanted her to marry Liu Kowloon so that there would be a successor to the Koenkan. He later helps Pai, Akira and the others to defeat Eva's Dural robot.

 
Like his game counterpart, Jacky still has the role of a known Formula One (in the game he is referred to be an IndyCar race driver). He travels along with his sister, Sarah Bryant and her pet flying squirrel in a RV whenever he is not doing any Formula One racing. Jacky tends to be protective of Sarah. There are suggestions throughout the series that he and Sarah belong to an American upper class family. (This was later ported into the games when Virtua Fighter 5 was released.)
First appears in Episode 3, "The Gorgeous Sibling Fighters"

 
Sarah is kind and gentle in the anime. She has a flying squirrel named Alexander for a pet and travels with Jacky Bryant in their RV. Whenever Jacky participates in any Formula One contest, Sarah helps out by doing racing queen duties. She is later kidnapped by Eva Durix to be used as a basis for creating a "Perfect Soldier", Dural. In the series, she has a crush on Akira but later has feelings for Kage.
First appears in Episode 3, "The Gorgeous Sibling Fighters"

 
Kage is first portrayed as a mercenary who kidnaps Sarah under the orders of Eva Durix and initially clashes with Akira. While Kage is with Sarah they begin to have feelings for each other. In the middle of the series, Kage decides to assist Akira, Pai and their allies after he had a case of guilty conscience over what he had done that resulted in the creation of Dural. He had also left his Hagakure clan village to hunt down Oni-Maru after most of his people had been massacred by him, who had wanted to kill Kage in order to gain the position as the head of the Hagakure clan.
First appears in Episode 5, "In Search of the Stars"

 
A wrestler that originally worked for Clive Maroni in a Casino.
First appears in Episode 13, "Arena of Darkness"

 
First appears in Episode 16, "The Sea Warrior"

 
A young teenage boy, the only son of a rather upper class French family. Like his counterpart in the games, he is a practitioner of Tourou-ken.
First appears in Episode 17, "Here Comes the Prince"

 
First appears in Episode 21, "A Wizard and a Master"

 
A rising martial arts practitioner in the Koenkan, he had plotted to use his upcoming marriage to Pai in order to become the next successor to Lau Chan as the next head of the Koenkan. Akira, Jacky and Sarah rescued Pai in Hong Kong, foiling his plot.

 
A former member of the Hagakure clan, he had been expelled by the village elders due to his plot to kill off Kage-Maru in order to become the clan's head. Enraged, Oni leaves to train himself and perfect his skills. He later orchestrates a massacre of his village kin, leading Kage to hunt him down in order to exact revenge for the deaths of the Hagakure clan.

 Voiced by: Kaneto Shiozawa
A monk that is a loyal follower and disciple of Oni-Maru. Although fighting at the side of the villains, Gaô has a mature, polite and respectful nature, and seems to follow a moral code of the fighter.

Nio Voiced by: Unknown
One of the Oni-Maru lackeys.

 
A robotics scientist who had wanted to create the "Perfect Soldier". She had assisted Liu in brainwashing Pai so as to "marry" her without any pressure. The brainwashing fails, and after Akira, Sarah and Jacky rescued Pai from Liu and the rest of the Koenkan, Eva seeks the backing of the Rafale Corporation. She employed the mercenary ninja Kage-Maru to kidnap Sarah to use her for the basis of Dural.
First appears in Episode 5, "In Search of the Stars"

Dural's origins are very different here from in the game versions; it had been created by robotics scientist Eva Durix through the backing of the Koenkan and later, the Rafale Corporation after Eva had a fallout with the Koenkan.

Episode list

Licensing
Virtua Fighter had been aired in various television stations in Argentina, Chile, Italy, Mexico, the Philippines and the Arabic part of the Middle East, dubbed in their national languages. The series had been licensed for distribution in North America by Anime Works. Due to falling sales, Anime Works had ended its distribution of the Virtua Fighter anime after dubbing 24 of the 35 episodes, and no other licensor would pick up the series until 2022 when Discotek Media announced they picked up the rights for the anime and will release it on Blu-Ray. This will include the first 24 episode that have the English dub while the rest will have Japanese translations.

RetroCrush announced that the first season would be streamed with English subtitles provided.

Reception
Hanami Gumi had praised the Virtua Fighter anime series, calling it "one of the best among those anime series that had fighting-game origins". The review said that the show had a clear, non-confusing plot, along with good characterization and background music. Asian Stuff has praised the series for its plot, saying "the fights don't drag on and that it doesn't resort to repetitive tournament crap".

An EX review had commented highly on Ryo Tanaka's character designs in the series, as they are "simple yet very effective in revealing the nature of the characters."

References

External links
 
 Virtua Fighter at CrystalAcids.com

1995 anime television series debuts
1996 Japanese television series endings
Adventure anime and manga
Anime television series based on video games
Anime Works
Martial arts anime and manga
Television shows set in Los Angeles
Television shows set in Las Vegas
Television shows set in Utah
Television shows set in New York City
Television shows set in Australia
Television shows set in France
Television shows set in Germany
Television shows set in Hong Kong
Television shows set in Japan
Television shows set in Vancouver
Television shows set in China
TMS Entertainment
TV Tokyo original programming
Virtua Fighter
Works based on Sega video games